Doğanbey is a village in the District of Söke, Aydın Province, Turkey. As of 2010, it had a population of 714 people.

References

Former Greek towns in Turkey
Villages in Söke District